Cira Centre South is a complex of two skyscrapers in the University City district of Philadelphia, Pennsylvania, directly across the Schuylkill River from Center City Philadelphia. The complex is between Walnut Street and Chestnut Street south of 30th Street Station and the Old Post Office Building.

The structure consists of two towers, the commercial and residential FMC Tower and the residential Evo Cira Centre South. Evo rises a total of 33 floors and 430 feet. It was jointly developed by Brandywine Realty Trust, Campus Crest Communities, and Harrison Street Real Estate Capital.

FMC Tower at Cira Centre South
FMC Tower is a 49-story, 861,000-square-foot mixed-use tower consisting of 622,000 square feet of office space, 268 residential units and suites, and 10,000 square feet of retail space.

It is the tallest building in University City and the 7th tallest building in the city of Philadelphia.

The largest tenant, FMC Corporation acquired the naming rights as part of its 16-year lease on 253,000 square feet. The University of Pennsylvania leases about 100,000 square feet at the property. Brandywine Realty Trust, the developer, relocated its headquarters from Radnor to the building, taking 46,000 square feet.

The University of Pennsylvania owns the land and leases the ground to Brandywine. Pelli Clarke Pelli Architects designed the property. The developers broke ground on the project in 2014 and completed the building in late 2017.

See also 

 Cira Centre
List of tallest buildings in Philadelphia

References

External links
 Evo apartments - Asset Campus Housing
 FMC Tower - Brandywine Realty Trust
 Cira Green - Brandywine Realty Trust
 Evo at Cira Centre South - Emporis.com
 FMC Tower at Cira Centre South - Emporis.com

César Pelli buildings
Skyscrapers in Philadelphia
FMC Corporation
University City, Philadelphia
Multi-building developments in Philadelphia